The ALWAC III-E was an early commercial vacuum-tube computer employing a rotating magnetic drum main storage unit, operational in 1955.

The invention of the ALWAC III-E is attributed to Axel Wenner-Gren, and the name is derived from Axel Leonard Wenner-Gren Automatic Computer, letter E stands for the E-register (index register). The ALWAC III-E contained 132–275 vacuum tubes, 5000–5400 silicon diodes, and cost $60,000–$80,000. Word size was 32 bits + sign + recoverable overflow bit.

Instruction execution times (including average memory access times) were 5.25–5.75 milliseconds for addition and subtraction, and 21.25 ms for multiplication and division.

An ALWAC III-E was installed at the University of British Columbia in March 1957 and remained in service until October 1961. Others were installed at Oregon State University (then College) and Loyola Marymount University (then Loyola University of Los Angeles). An ALWAC III-E was installed by the CIA in September, 1957 in the offices of the Photographic Intelligence Division. Located at Fifth and K streets NW. and given the name Project Automat, the ALWAC was used to analyze pictures taken by U-2 spy planes.

Memory

Wegematic 1000
In 1960 Wenner-Gren Centre Foundation donated a Wegematic 1000 (based on ALWAC III-E) computer to the University of Turku in Turku, Finland.

Further reading

References

External links
Photo of ALWAC III-E at UBC: 

Vacuum tube computers
1950s computers